Lambdopsalis bulla is an extinct multituberculate mammal from the Late Paleocene of China and Mongolia. It is placed within the suborder Cimolodonta and is a member of the superfamily Taeniolabidoidea. Fossil remains have been found in the Late Paleocene Nomogen and Khashat Formations in Nao-mugen and Bayn Ulan of China and Mongolia.

Hair and fur fossilize very infrequently, if at all. This genus of burrowing multituberculate mammals provides one of the earliest unequivocal examples of mammal fur (Lower Cretaceous fossils of Eomaia, Volaticotherium and Castorocauda with the fur preserved still attached are currently the oldest). Indirect evidence suggest that hair first appeared on non-mammalian therapsids (Therapsida), back in the Triassic or even earlier. This is inferred from small hollows on the bone of the snout similar to holes in the skulls of cats which provide space for concentrations of nerves and blood vessels that innervate prominent whiskers (specialized hairs). This adaptation allows cats to use their whiskers as effective tactile sensory organs.

In the same Upper Paleocene strata, exceptionally preserved coprolites, originally excreted by unknown carnivorous animals, were discovered to contain undigested remains, including hair from Lambdopsalis and three other different mammal taxa.

Studies on its tooth prism and enamel patterns have been performed. It had deciduous enamel, and there is evidence that adults and juveniles had substantially different diets.

References

Bibliography 
 
 
 Much of this information is derived from  MESOZOIC MAMMALS; Eucosmodontidae, Microcosmodontidae and Taeniolabidoidea, an Internet directory

Cimolodonts
Paleocene mammals of Asia
Paleocene genus extinctions
Prehistoric animals of China
Fossils of Mongolia
Fossil taxa described in 1978
Prehistoric mammal genera